This page provides the list of members - incumbent and previous - of cabinet, or State Council, of South Korean President Park Geun-hye.

Timeline

List of Members

See also
 Cabinet of Moon Jae-in

References

Government of South Korea
Park Geun-hye Government
Park Geun-hye
Park Geun-hye